Award-winning German composer and music producer Hans Zimmer has composed and produced over one hundred soundtracks and film scores. Of them, about 50 soundtracks and songs were nominated for awards. He has won two Academy Awards (The Lion King, Dune), four Satellite Awards (The Thin Red Line, Gladiator, The Last Samurai, Inception), three Golden Globe Awards (The Lion King, Gladiator, Dune), four Grammy Awards (two prizes for The Lion King, Crimson Tide, The Dark Knight), three Saturn Awards (The Dark Knight, Inception, Interstellar), two Annie Awards (Kung Fu Panda, Secrets of the Furious Five), and two WAFCA Awards (Inception, Dune).

As composer

Feature films

1980s

1990s

2000s

2010s

2020s

Short films

Television

Video games

As soundtrack producer
These are for films and other media which Zimmer did not compose the score, but for which he produced the soundtrack.

1980s

1990s

2000s

2010s

2020s

As other
These are for films which Zimmer did not serve as main composer, but still contributed original music to the score

1980s

1990s

2000s

2010s

Live albums

As contributor
Albums by other musicians, featuring guest appearances by Zimmer. Sorted chronologically.
 1980: The Damned, "The History of the World (Part 1)" single, included on The Black Album (additional synthesizers and engineering)
 1985: Shriekback, Oil and Gold (1985), (additional synthesizers and engineering)

References

Discography
Discographies of German artists
Discographies of classical composers
Film and television discographies